MSpy may refer to:
 mSpy, a brand of mobile and computer parental control monitoring software.
 Microsoft Pinyin IME, the pinyin input method implementation developed by Microsoft and Harbin Institute of Technology.